Overseas Filipino Worker (OFW) is a term often used to refer to Filipino migrant workers, people with Filipino citizenship who reside in another country for a limited period of employment. The number of these workers was roughly 1.77 million between April and September 2020. Of these, female workers comprised a larger portion, making up 59.6 percent, or 1.06 million. However, this number declined to 405.62 thousand between 2019 and 2020.

Etymology
The term "Overseas Filipino Worker" (OFW) was used as early as the 1990s to refer to Filipino migrant workers, when Republic Act 8042, also known as the Migrant Workers and Overseas Filipinos Act of 1995 was enacted. The term was officially adopted by the Philippine government when the Philippine Overseas Employment Administration (POEA) adopted the 2002 POEA Rules and Regulations Governing the Recruitment and Employment of Land-based Overseas Workers. Historically, particularly during the administration of President Ferdinand Marcos, the term "Overseas Contract Worker" (OCW) was used.

For statistical and probability purposes, the term "Overseas Contract Worker" refers to OFWs with an active employment contract, while OFWs who are not OCWs are migrant workers currently without a contract who had one within a given period of time.

History

Early 1900s
Filipino migrant workers were working outside the Philippine islands as early as the 1900s, when Filipino agricultural workers were deployed to Hawaii to satisfy temporary labor needs in the then-U.S. territory's agricultural sector. Filipino workers then went on to the Mainland United States to work in hotels, restaurants, and sawmills, as well as getting involved in railroad construction. They also worked in plantations in California and the canning industry of the then-American territory of Alaska. Some Filipinos also served in the U.S. Army during World War II.

After World War II
Following the end of World War II, some Filipinos who served in the U.S. Army became American citizens. The United States also saw increased immigration of Filipino medical professionals, accountants, engineers, and other technical workers after the war. From the 1950s to the 1960s, non-professional contract workers began migrating to other Asian countries; artists, barbers, and musicians worked in East Asia, and loggers worked in Kalimantan, the Indonesian portion of the island of Borneo.

Start of systemic migration
According to the Philippine Department of Labor and Employment, "active and systemic migration" of Filipinos for temporary employment began by the 1960s, when the United States Government, contractors of the United States Armed Forces, and civilian agencies began recruiting Filipinos to work in jobs in the construction and service sector. Filipinos also worked in select areas in the Pacific and Southeast Asia, namely Japan, Thailand, Vietnam, and the U.S. territories of Guam and Wake Island.

More Filipino medical workers also began to search for work in Australia, Canada, and the United States, leading the Philippine government to come up with a new labor code in 1974, which included Filipino migrant workers in its scope. This labor code, also known as the "Labor Code of the Philippines" (Presidential Decree 442, series 1974), was issued by then-President Ferdinand Marcos shortly after declaring martial law in the Philippines via Proclamation No. 1081. The decree formally established a recruitment and placement program "to ensure the careful selection of Filipino workers for the overseas labor market to protect the good name of the Philippines abroad". Three government agencies were created to tend to the needs of Filipino migrant workers: the National Seamen Board, Overseas Employment Development Board, and the Bureau of Employment Services, which were later merged in 1978 to create the Philippine Overseas Employment Administration. Marcos' labor policy was meant to be a short-term employment program and address the country's need for foreign exchange.

Construction workers and engineers also began to be recruited by multinational companies in oil-rich nations in the Middle East, which were then experiencing an economic boom.

Post–People Power Revolution
After Ferdinand Marcos was removed from office following the People Power Revolution of February 1986, his successor Corazon Aquino issued Executive Order No. 126, which renamed the Welfare Fund as the Overseas Workers Welfare Administration (OWWA). In 1995, the Republic Act 8042, or Migrant Workers and Overseas Filipinos Act, became law.

700,000 of the world's mariners come from the Philippines, being the world's largest origin of seafarers; In 2018, Filipino seafarers sent home the equivalent of US$6.14 billion.

Then-President Rodrigo Duterte announced that in 2021, the Philippines would limit the annual number of health professionals (including nurses) it sends abroad to 5,000, from about 13,000 that currently leave every year.

Government policy

The Philippine government has stated officially for decades that it doesn't maintain a labor export policy, and has continued to claim so as of 2012.

Agencies
During the Presidency of Ferdinand Marcos, three government agencies were created to tend to the needs of Filipino migrant workers, namely:

 National Seamen Board (NSB) : To "develop and maintain a comprehensive program for Filipino seamen employed overseas".
 Overseas Employment Development Board (OEDB) – To "promote the overseas employment of Filipino workers through a comprehensive market and development program".
 Bureau of Employment Services (BES) – responsible for the regulation of "private sector participation in the recruitment of (local and overseas) workers".

In 1982, these three agencies were consolidated to create the Philippine Overseas Employment Administration (POEA), which later became an attached agency to the Department of Labor and Employment. On December 30, 2021, then-President Duterte signed into law the "Department of Migrant Workers Act" (Republic Act 11641), which consolidates all OFW-related services into one department. The new Department of Migrant Workers is slated to be operational by 2023.

Reception
The Migrante Partylist has cited two reasons that the Philippine government created a more systemic labor export policy during the administration of Ferdinand Marcos: To quell dissent brought about by massive domestic unemployment and the political crisis, and to consolidate foreign exchange from remittances.

Recruitment
The Philippine Overseas Employment Administration (POEA) was a government agency tasked with supervising labor recruitment agencies in the Philippines. Recruitment and deployment agencies are mandated by the POEA to monitor the situation of Overseas Filipino Workers, including if they are with their supposed employers and if employers provide assistance to the Filipino worker in case of emergency.

Taxation
Remittances sent by Overseas Filipino Workers to the Philippines from abroad are not themselves subject to taxation by the Philippine government, which has no jurisdiction over foreign remittance. However, a value-added tax is imposed on transfer fees charged by the remittance companies. Under Presidential Decree No. 1183 and Republic Act No.8042, or the Migrant Workers and Overseas Filipino Act of 1995, Overseas Filipino Workers are exempt from travel tax and airport terminal fees when traveling out of the Philippines from within the country.

Female overseas Filipino workers
Despite many Filipina migrant workers having received higher education and working as skilled nurses, 58 out of 100 overseas Filipino women workers are categorized as laborers and unskilled workers compared to 13 out of 100 overseas Filipino male workers in a 2007 survey. Filipino women often fill "the demand for unskilled, low-paid domestic work in high-income countries". They are encouraged to take these overseas jobs due to high unemployment rates in the Philippines and the economy benefiting from remittances.

Medical concerns
A study conducted by Veronica Ramirez of the Center for Research and Communication has found that because they are afraid of losing employment and since most clinics are closed on Sundays, which is the typical OFW's day off, a majority of female OFWs find it difficult to obtain medical treatment, resorting to self-medication instead.

Mental health concerns
Despite financial benefits from working overseas, separation from family and cultural ties have proved detrimental to the health of Filipino migrant workers. Many Filipino women working abroad have experienced worsening mental health, reporting symptoms of depression from a loss of belonging, loneliness, and guilt.

Unsafe workplaces and abuse are another big problem, with "more than 40% of labour Filipino migrants in the USA report[ing] high levels of workplace discrimination". Filipino women are often associated with stereotypes such as being mail-order brides and having submissive attributes, which further adds to their discrimination in and out of the workplace.

Impact on governance
Empirical research has demonstrated that Filipino migrants and the remittances they send back to families are correlated with better governance. Exposure to the democratic politics and efficient bureaucracies in host countries allows migrants to use their remittances to urge relatives back home to demand better governance, at least in the context of enhancing the efficient provision of public goods at the provincial level.

Countries

Overseas Filipino Workers can only be legally deployed to countries certified by the Philippine Department of Foreign Affairs to be compliant with Republic Act 10022, also known as the Amended Migrant Workers Act.

See also
 Overseas Filipinos
 Human trafficking in the Philippines
 Flor Contemplacion
 Tenaga Kerja Indonesia (TKI) – Indonesian counterpart

References

External links

 POEA Rules and Regulations. Governing the Recruitment and Employment of Land-based Overseas Workers

 
Economy of the Philippines
Filipino expatriates
1990s neologisms